The 2020 Inter-County Under-20 Football Championship is the 57th edition of the competition, and the third since the competition was re-graded from Under 21 to Under 20. It is also referred to as the EirGrid GAA Football U20 All-Ireland Championship for sponsorship purposes.

Player eligibility

At the start of the championship footballers aged under 20 cannot play for both their county's senior and under-20 championship teams. Initially a footballer must opt to play for either the senior or the under-20 team. Once a county's senior team exits the senior championship all of their under-20 players are then eligible to play for the county under-20 team.

This rule was introduced to prevent player burnout and avoid scheduling conflicts when the senior and under-20 championships are played in the same summer months as both county teams have distinct panels of players. Inevitably some county under-20 teams play without their best under-20 footballers as a result of the player eligibility rule.

Competition format
Provincial Championships format

Connacht, Leinster, Munster and Ulster each organise a provincial championship. Each province decides the format for their championship – the format can be straight knockout, double-elimination, a league, groups, etc. or a combination.

All-Ireland format

The four provincial winners play in two All-Ireland Under-20 Football Semi-finals, with the winners of those matches playing in the All-Ireland Final.

Provincial championships

Connacht

Quarter-final

Semi-finals

Final

Leinster

Preliminary round

Quarter-finals

Semi-finals

Final

Munster

Quarter-finals

Semi-finals

Final

Ulster

Preliminary round

Quarter-finals

Semi-finals

Final

All-Ireland

Semi-finals

Final

Notes

References

All-Ireland Under 20 Football Championship
All-Ireland Under-20 Football Championships
All-Ireland Championship